Copestylum vittatum, the striped bromeliad fly, is a species of syrphid fly in the family Syrphidae. It is widely distributed in North America.

References

External links

 

Eristalinae
Diptera of North America
Hoverflies of North America
Articles created by Qbugbot
Insects described in 1976
Taxa named by F. Christian Thompson